Veluwezoom National Park is a national park of the Netherlands located in the province of Gelderland. This park is the oldest national park of the Netherlands. It has a surface area of 50 square kilometers at the southeastern edge of the Veluwe, a complex of terminal push moraines from the Saalian glaciation. It has a pronounced relief by Dutch standards, with the highest point in the park at 110 meters above sea level. It is a private national park, owned by Vereniging Natuurmonumenten, the largest nature conservation organisation in the Netherlands.

The landscape of the park consists of forests and heathland, which is kept open by grazing of Highland cattle, and a small sand drift, which is kept open by human maintenance. The native fauna is represented by red deer, wild boar, badger and the regionally rare pine marten.

References

External links 
 Nationaal Park Veluwezoom, Natuurmonumenten

Protected areas established in 1930
1930 establishments in the Netherlands
Forests of the Netherlands
National parks of the Netherlands
Geography of Gelderland
Tourist attractions in Gelderland
Arnhem
Rozendaal